Runan may refer to:

Runan County, in Henan, China
Runan, Côtes-d'Armor, commune in France